Xinghuacun Subdistrict is a subdistrict in Guichi District, Chizhou, Anhui. , it administers Xinghuacun Village and the following six residential neighborhoods: 
Chikou
Chengxi
Shili
Kongjing
Changgang
Duwu

See also 
 List of township-level divisions of Anhui

References 

Township-level divisions of Anhui
Chizhou
Subdistricts of the People's Republic of China